Lazafeno is a Malagasy politician. A member of the National Assembly of Madagascar, he was elected from the Antoko Miombona Ezaka party; he represents the constituency of Bealanana.

External links
Profile on National Assembly site 

Year of birth missing (living people)
Living people
Members of the National Assembly (Madagascar)
Place of birth missing (living people)
People from Sofia Region